On the Same Planet is a 1965 Soviet drama film directed by Ilya Olshvanger.

Plot 
The film tells about Lieutenant Reshetov, who observes the total collapse of the Russian army and decides to go to Petrograd to kill Lenin.

Cast 
Innokenty Smoktunovsky as Vladimir Lenin
 Emma Popova as Nadezhda Krupskaya
 Yulyen Balmusov as Felix Dzerzhinsky
 Andro Kobaladze as Joseph Stalin
 Panteleymon Krymov
Yevgeni Lebedev as Yakov Spiridonov
 Pavel Luspekayev as Nikolai Markin
Nikolay Simonov as Col. Robbins
 Yefim Kopelyan as Spanish Ambassador
 Bruno O'Ya as American journalist

References

External links 
 

1965 films
1960s Russian-language films
Soviet drama films
1965 drama films